Lubok Mukim (also known as "Mukim 1" in Malay Mukim Lubok) is a mukim in Batu Pahat District, Johor, Malaysia. This district would be surrounded by the mukims of Bagan (east) and Simpang Kiri (River Left) (north) and the Muar district (west).

Administration
Lubok is one of 14 mukims found in Batu Pahat, Johor.

Lubok Mukim covers several villages.

External links 
 Pejabat Daerah Batu Pahat.
 Pecahan daerah Batu Pahat.

Mukims of Batu Pahat District